The Accidental Spy is a 2017 Nigerian Crime comedy film directed by Roger Russell and produced by Darlington Abuda with Nosa Aghayere Dag as its executive producer. The film stars Ayo Makun, Ramsey Nouah, Henry Morris, Agatha Ezzedine, Miguel A. Núñez Jr. Alibaba Akpobome and Daniel Eghan. It was released on 1 December 2017 and premiered on Netflix on November 29, 2019.

Plot  
The theme of the film revolves around an IT specialist Emmanuel Prince (Ramsey Noah) who took a trip to America to refocus his energy after his girlfriend cheated on him. While in America, the Chairman a very powerful cartel leader hires a professional assassin to kill the inventor of a new energy source which is affecting the cartel markets. Emmanuel then mix up in the whole affair through signing up for a reality show and mistakenly takes on the identity of the assassin, thereby creating massive confusion and thus saving the life of  the inventor.

Cast 
 Christine Allado as Beverly
 Judith Akuta as Sandra
 Dan Allen as Armed Police Officer
 Steve Broad as FBI Director Shane Glower
 Ayemere Caleb as David
 Emmanuel Edunjobi as James
 Daniel Eghan as Agent
 Agatha Ezzedine as PA of Shane Glower
 Elma Godwin as Doctor Adu
 Andi Jashy as Cop 1
 Mark Knight as Armed police officer
 Vladimira Krckova as Journalist
 Matthew Leonhart as Tech Guy
 Ayo Makun as John
 Simon Maroulis as Armed Policeman Phillip (as Simon Green)
 Henry Morris as Cop
 Thenjiwe Moseley as Self
 Ramsey Nouah as Manny
 Miguel A. Núñez Jr. as The Viper
 Steve Owles as Steve
 Jonah Ripley as Armed Police Officer
 David Savizon as Delivery Agent
 Michael Lumb as Embassy Guest (uncredited)
 Alibaba Akpobome

References

External links 

 
 

English-language Nigerian films